Garth Harris is a Canadian Paralympic swimmer. He represented Canada at the 1996 Summer Paralympics held in Atlanta, United States and he won the bronze medal in the men's 50 metres breaststroke SB3 event.

References

External links 
 

Living people
Year of birth missing (living people)
Place of birth missing (living people)
Canadian male breaststroke swimmers
Swimmers at the 1996 Summer Paralympics
Medalists at the 1996 Summer Paralympics
Paralympic bronze medalists for Canada
Paralympic medalists in swimming
Paralympic swimmers of Canada
S4-classified Paralympic swimmers